The 2015 South Carolina Gamecocks baseball team represents the University of South Carolina in the 2015 NCAA Division I baseball season.  The Gamecocks play their home games in Carolina Stadium. The team is coached by Chad Holbrook, who is in his third season as head coach at Carolina.

Personnel

Roster

2015 South Carolina Gamecocks Baseball Roster & Bios http://www.gamecocksonline.com/sports/m-basebl/mtt/scar-m-basebl-mtt.html

Coaching staff

2015 South Carolina Gamecocks Baseball Coaches & Bios https://web.archive.org/web/20110926074934/http://gamecocksonline.cstv.com/sports/m-basebl/mtt/scar-m-basebl-mtt.html#coaches

Schedule

Honors and awards

 Wil Crowe was named SEC Co-Pitcher of the Week on March 16,

Rankings

Gamecocks in the 2015 MLB Draft
The following members of the South Carolina Gamecocks baseball program were drafted in the 2015 Major League Baseball Draft.

References

External links
 Gamecock Baseball official website

South Carolina Gamecocks baseball seasons
South Carolina Gamecocks Baseball Team, 2015
South